Dufus is an American band based in New York City, led by Seth Faergolzia, a North American singer, musician, songwriter, record producer, filmmaker, sculptor, painter, tiny house builder, and author. Faergolzia is most well-known for his unusual songwriting and enigmatic voice of over 5 octaves. The band is known for their revolving door membership, with anywhere from two to 25 members on stage. Seth Faergolzia is the extremely prolific mainstay of the group but also tours as a solo artist and with his newer projects Multibird and Forest Creature.. He has performed in over 20 countries and recorded over 40 full-length albums. Faergolzia has worked with ROIR (Reach Out International Records) US, IronMan Records UK, Blang Records UK, Trikont Germany, Rough Trade UK, and most recently Needlejuice Records US. He has written a musical, Fun Wearing Underwear, performed in NYC's Lower East Side for four months.

Dufus, critically acclaimed as an avant-freakout band is noted for its experimentation, revolving door membership, and its communal amiability. Faergolzia's newer project, Multibird, is a present-day band project that ranges from expansive improvisations to raucous toe-tappers to soft, touching, and careful songs.

Faergolzia's success comes in part because of his continuous work for over 20 years touring and recording constantly, making him an underground anomaly. He is a contemporary of acts such as the Moldy Peaches, Regina Spektor, Diane Cluck, Langhorne Slim, and Dan Deacon.

Faergolzia's music expresses positivity, creativity, kindheartedness, and social/political change. He is left-leaning in his politics. His music is often described as a circus mixed with an opera mixed with oddball freakfolk.
 
As a visual artist, Faergolzia has been featured on the cover of The New York Times art section and was the featured artist in a group show with Jean Paul Basquiat, which The New York Times lauded as "fiber art going punk."

Seth Faergolzia recently completed a 12 album box set of unreleased music entitled "Painbow," consisting of four solo albums of new works, four solo albums of songs from the early 2000s, and four live albums of his early project Dufus.

Dufus's music is difficult to categorize but is experimental in nature and manages to maintain a melodic center. The band's music is profoundly odd, according to City Newspaper in Rochester, NY, and "like Johnny Cash on 5 double-espressos," according to Die Rheinpfalz in Germany. Village Voice, NYC, describes it as "As giddy and inventive as it is pissed off, it's the 21st-century equivalent of the Fugs at their finest." Pop Matters says, "I have never heard anything like this before or since."

The music itself is difficult to pin down. Justin Cober-Lake, in his 1:3:1 review for PopMatters puts it simply, "If all this sounds crazy to you, you're on the right track."

In 2010, since the dissolution of Dufus, Seth has been heading an ever-evolving musical endeavor known as Multibird, plus multiple side projects under his name and psuedonyms. He is still an active touring musician.

Discography

Dufus 
 The 2nd Phone (2023)
 Welcome to the June Haus (2023)
 Weirld (2023)
 The Noo Yoo Maschine (2023)
 Eth (2010)
 In Montstrous Attitude (2009)
 King Astronaut (2007)
 Legend of Walnut (2007)
 Bristol Hills Music Camp Experimental Orchestra (2007. Whprwhil Records)
 The Last Classed Blast (2006. Iron Man)
 Ball of Design (2004. ROIR)
 1:3:1 (2002. ROIR)
 Neuborns (2001. Iron Man)
 Funderwear (2000)
 Th!s Revolution (1998)
 Eee-Lai-FoNt (1997)

 Seth Faergolzia (other projects) 

 Seth Faergolzia: Man On Top (2023)
 Seth Faergolzia: The Zingpow Train (2023)
 Seth Faergolzia: Awe Some Dang (2023)
 Seth Faergolzia: Old For Got (2023)
 "Seth Faergolzia: Not Ants" (2022)
 "Seth Faergolzia: Not Only Because but Also Because" (2022)
 "Seth Faergolzia: Clutch of Seven" (2022)
 Multibird: Xactly (2022)
 Multibird (self titled} (2020)
 "Seth Faergolzia: Loop Paintings" (2018)
 "Seth Faergolzia: High Diver" (2016)
 "Seth Faergolzia: Doubting Won't Do" (2014)
 "Forest Creature (self titled)" (2013)
 "Channel Faergolzia" (2009)
 Seth Faergolzia: Don't Call Me Hippie (2003)
 Quankmeyer Faergolzia (2000)
 Seth Faergolzia: Brand Purpose Syndrome'' (1998)

References

External links 
Village Voice New York article on the band during their 2003 tour to Promote 1:3:1
Band's official site including tour date information for international touring
[ Allmusic guide]
Last FM Biography
Dufus collection at the Internet Archive's live music archive
Interview with Seth Hebert-Faergoliza on Earz Magazine, 2008

ROIR artists